In enzymology, a hexadecanal dehydrogenase (acylating) is an enzyme that catalyzes the chemical reaction

hexadecanal + CoA + NAD+  hexadecanoyl-CoA + NADH + H+

The 3 substrates of this enzyme are hexadecanal, CoA, and NAD+, whereas its 3 products are hexadecanoyl-CoA, NADH, and H+.

This enzyme belongs to the family of oxidoreductases, specifically those acting on the aldehyde or oxo group of donor with NAD+ or NADP+ as acceptor.  The systematic name of this enzyme class is hexadecanal:NAD+ oxidoreductase (CoA-acylating). This enzyme is also called fatty acyl-CoA reductase.

References

 

EC 1.2.1
NADH-dependent enzymes
Enzymes of unknown structure